Noyal-Muzillac is a commune in the Morbihan department of Brittany in north-western France. Inhabitants of Noyal-Muzillac are called in French Noyalais.

See also
Communes of the Morbihan department

References

External links

Official website 
Mayors of Morbihan Association 

Communes of Morbihan